Oleksiy Borysov (born June 1, 1983 in Sevastopol) is a sailor He competed for Ukraine at the 2012 Summer Olympics in the Men's Finn class. In 2014, after the annexation of Sevastopol, Crimea to Russia, he received a Russian citizenship as Aleksey Borisov.

References

1983 births
Living people
Sportspeople from Sevastopol
Ukrainian male sailors (sport)
Olympic sailors of Ukraine
Sailors at the 2012 Summer Olympics – Finn
Naturalised citizens of Russia
Russian male sailors (sport)